NewBlue was founded in 2006 in San Diego, California developing software for the post production video industry.  

The company began by developing video effects, transitions, and titling software for consumer and professional video editing software host applications. The company has licensed its software ("plugins") for use in Avid Media Composer, Grass Valley EDIUS, Sony VEGAS, MAGIX Movie Edit Pro, Corel VideoStudio, Pinnacle Studio and CyberLink PowerDirector.

At the urging of a leading manufacturer of live video production switchers, NewBlue entered the live production side of the video industry in 2016. Titler Live was launched that year and is used by a variety of broadcast, education, sports, house of worship, corporate and government customers. NewBlue’s live video production technology has also been licensed by Telestream, PrestoSports, and Broadcast Pix.

NewBlue has a broad portfolio of more than ten patented technologies in cloud video production, data-driven graphics, live and post graphics, real-time graphics rendering, and live-to-post video production. Patent information can be viewed the US Patent Trademark Office.

In July 2021, NewBlue used the Blackmagic Design SDK to combine the ATEM with the NewBlue graphics software. The combination provides on-air graphics and live switching.

Products 

 Titler Live. graphics software for live video productions. 
 Fusion 2. A short-depth 1U rackmount chassis running Titler Live Broadcast. 
 VividCast. All-in-one live video streaming software
 TotalFX. titling, tools and effects plugins for video editing.
 Titler Pro. Titling software for video editors.

References 

Software companies based in California
Video editing software
Special effects companies
Software companies of the United States
Software companies established in 2005
2005 establishments in California
American companies established in 2005